Gordana Ćulibrk (1952) is a Serbian writer. She lives and works in Belgrade.

She publishes prose and poetry. She received the Crnjanski Stage Award in 1999 for the short story "The Wolf". Ćulibrk is the founder and member of the editorial board of the literary magazine Pokus, as well as the editor of the ID "Književna akademija". She is a member of the Belgrade Writers' Association.

Works
 The Power of the Imprint (2004), a book of poetry
 A desolate island in the heart of civilization (2007), a novel
 Vrnite mi Metohiju (2007)

Her books were translated into French, English and Russian. She is represented in several anthologies.

References

External links 
 literary academy
Translated and adapted from Serbo-Croatian Wikipedia: Gordana Ćulibrk

1952 births
Living people
Serbian poets
People from Belgrade
Writers from Belgrade